Wallerfield is a residential and industrial area east of Arima in Trinidad and Tobago. It served as Waller Air Force Base, and since the closure of U.S. Army base in May 1949 it became the informal home of various types of racing (using former airstrips) for over 40 years. It is the site of a new multimillion-dollar University of Trinidad and Tobago campus complex, as well as several housing developments and other projects.  Further projects have been planned to transform it into Trinidad and Tobago's first science and technology research park, which will be known as the Tamana InTech Park.

References

Further reading 
 Wallerfield History at the National Library of Trinidad and Tobago.
 
 

Arima
Neighbourhoods in Trinidad and Tobago